John Alexander Stewart,  (1867 – October 7, 1922) was a Canadian politician.

Born in Renfrew, Ontario, he was a lawyer before being elected to the House of Commons of Canada for the Ontario riding of Lanark. A Unionist, he was appointed Minister of Railways and Canals on September 21, 1921, but served at the post for only three months.

External links
 

1867 births
1922 deaths
Canadian Ministers of Railways and Canals
Members of the House of Commons of Canada from Ontario
Members of the King's Privy Council for Canada
Unionist Party (Canada) MPs